Colcu may refer to:

Colcu mac Domnaill (d. 580), king of Ailech
Colgú mac Faílbe Flaind (d. 678), king of Munster
Colcú mac Bressail (d.722), father of Áed mac Colggen, king of Leinster
Colcu ua Duinechda (d. 796), abbot of Clonmacnoise
Colcu mac Connacan (d. 884), abbot of Kinnitty
Çölçü, a 2012 Azerbaijani drama film